Steve Kroll (born 7 May 1997) is a German professional footballer who plays as a goalkeeper for Darmstadt 98.

References

External links
 
 

1997 births
Living people
Footballers from Berlin
German footballers
Association football goalkeepers
1. FC Union Berlin players
Wormatia Worms players
Sportfreunde Lotte players
SpVgg Unterhaching players
SV Darmstadt 98 players
3. Liga players
Regionalliga players